Ironbound is the 15th full-length studio album by American thrash metal band Overkill, which was released on January 29, 2010 in Europe on Nuclear Blast and in the U.S. on February 9, 2010 on eOne Music. It was their first studio album in more than two years since the release of Immortalis in the fall of 2007, and their first release on their current label Nuclear Blast.

Reception

Ironbound was given highly positive reviews with vocalist, Bobby "Blitz" Ellsworth, being a main point of critical acclaim. Chad Bowar of About.com states, "What makes Overkill stand out is vocalist Bobby “Blitz” Ellsworth, whose high pitched singing is unique and instantly recognizable. He's able to dial it down and sing in a lower range, but can wail when it's required." A review from Blabbermouth.net says, ""Ironbound" is one of, if not the most ripping collection of tunes this legendary act has laid to tape." Exodus and former Slayer lead guitarist Gary Holt called Ironbound "one of their best records ever; it's so good".

Ironbound was Overkill's first album to chart on the Billboard 200 in 17 years, since I Hear Black in 1993. It sold over 4,100 copies in its first week in the U.S. and over 15,000 copies in the U.S by May 2010. Ironbound has been referred to as a "comeback" for Overkill after years of lackluster album sales, as well as an experimentation with groove metal and a decline in popularity in the U.S., which the band had had since the mid-1990s.

Track listing

Charts

Credits
Writing, performance and production credits are adapted from the album liner notes.

Personnel
Overkill
 Bobby "Blitz" Ellsworth – lead vocals
 D.D. Verni – bass, backing vocals
 Dave Linsk – lead guitar
 Derek Tailer – rhythm guitar
 Ron Lipnicki – drums

Production
 Overkill – production
 Peter Tägtgren – mixing (at The Abyss)
 D.D. Verni, Dave Linsk – engineering
 Jonas Kjellgren – mastering
 Jon "Jonnyrod" Ciorciari – recording (at JRod Productions)
 Dave Linsk – recording (at SKH Recording Studios)
 Dan Korneff – editing

Artwork and design
 Travis Smith – cover art, layout
 Eddie Malluk – photography

Studios
 The Abyss, Ludvika, Sweden – mixing
 Gear Recording Studio, Shrewsbury, New Jersey – recording
 JRod Productions, Pomona, New York – additional recording
 SKH Recording Studios, Stuart, Florida – additional recording

References

Overkill (band) albums
2010 albums
Nuclear Blast albums
Albums with cover art by Travis Smith (artist)